Gorzków may refer to the following places:
Gorzków, Bochnia County in Lesser Poland Voivodeship (south Poland)
Gorzków, Wieliczka County in Lesser Poland Voivodeship (south Poland)
Gorzków, Krasnystaw County in Lublin Voivodeship (east Poland)
Gorzków, Kazimierza County in Świętokrzyskie Voivodeship (south-central Poland)
Gorzków, Staszów County in Świętokrzyskie Voivodeship (south-central Poland)